In mathematics education, Finite Mathematics is a syllabus in college and university mathematics that is independent of calculus. A course in precalculus may be a prerequisite for Finite Mathematics.

Contents of the course include an eclectic selection of topics often applied in social science and business, such as finite probability spaces, matrix multiplication, Markov processes, finite graphs, or mathematical models. These topics were used in Finite Mathematics courses at Dartmouth College (home of Tuck School of Business) as developed by John G. Kemeny, Gerald L. Thompson, and J. Laurie Snell and published by Prentice-Hall. Other publishers followed with their own topics. With the arrival of software to facilitate computations, teaching and usage shifted from a broad-spectrum Finite Mathematics with paper and pen, into development and usage of software.

Textbooks
 1957: Kemeny, Thompson, Snell, Introduction to Finite Mathematics, (2nd edition 1966) Prentice-Hall
 1959: Hazelton Mirkil & Kemeny, Thompson, Snell, Finite Mathematical Structures, Prentice-Hall
 1962: Arthur Schliefer Jr. & Kemeny, Thompson, Snell, Finite Mathematics with Business Applications, Prentice-Hall
 1969: Marvin Marcus, A Survey of Finite Mathematics, Houghton-Mifflin
 1970: Guillermo Owen, Mathematics for Social and Management Sciences, Finite Mathematics, W. B. Saunders
 1970: Irving Allen Dodes, Finite Mathematics: A Liberal Arts Approach, McGraw-Hill
 1971: A.W. Goodman & J. S. Ratti, Finite Mathematics with Applications, Macmillan
 1971: J. Conrad Crown & Marvin L. Bittinger, Finite Mathematics: a modeling approach, (2nd edition 1981) Addison-Wesley
 1977: Robert F. Brown & Brenda W. Brown, Applied Finite Mathematics, Wadsworth Publishing
 1980: L.J. Goldstein, David I. Schneider, Martha Siegel, Finite Mathematics and Applications, (7th edition 2001) Prentice-Hall
 1981: John J. Costello, Spenser O. Gowdy, Agnes M. Rash, Finite Mathematics with Applications, Harcourt, Brace, Jovanovich
 1982: James Radlow, Understanding Finite Mathematics, PWS Publishers
 1984: Daniel Gallin, Finite Mathematics, Scott Foresman
 1984: Gary G. Gilbert & Donald O. Koehler, Applied Finite Mathematics, McGraw-Hill
 1984: Frank S. Budnick, Finite Mathematics with Applications in Management and the Social Sciences, McGraw Hill 
 2015: Chris P. Tsokos & Rebecca D. Wooton, The Joy of Finite Mathematics, Academic Press

See also
 
 Discrete mathematics
 Finite geometry
 Finite group, Finite ring, Finite field 
 Finite topological space

References

Mathematics education